"Old Habits" is a song written and recorded by American musician Hank Williams Jr. It was released in August 1980 as the second single from the album Habits Old and New.  The song reached #6 on the Billboard Hot Country Singles & Tracks chart.

Chart performance

References

1980 singles
Hank Williams Jr. songs
Songs written by Hank Williams Jr.
Song recordings produced by Jimmy Bowen
Elektra Records singles
Curb Records singles
1980 songs